Kuninkaanportti or Kungsporten (Finnish and Swedish respectively for "the king's gate") is the principal entrance to the fortress Suomenlinna (Swedish: Sveaborg) outside Helsinki. It is on the southernmost island of Suomenlinna, in front of the Kustaanmiekka strait, and is considered the main symbol of Suomenlinna.

The gate was constructed from 1753 to 1754 at the place where King Adolf Frederick of Sweden anchored his ship when he was coming to inspect the construction of the fortress. The name "the king's gate" comes from this.

The gate is a typical fortress gate with cannon openings. There are wide stairs leading to the gate, but in front of the gate is a drawbridge and a wide pit at both sides, to hinder climbing into the fortress.

The gate was featured in the 1000 Finnish mark note in the last series, from 1986 to 2001.

As a decoration, the sides of the gate feature four stone tablets which were written by the designer of the fortress, Augustin Ehrensvärd, in Swedish:

 Här har konung Fredrik låtit läggs den första sten år 1748 ("Here laid King Frederick the first stone in the year 1748")
 Och konung Gustaf har lagt den sista sten år .. ("And here laid King Gustav the last stone in the year", the year is left unwritten, because Gustav III never arrived to lay the last stone)
 Sveaborg som rörer hafvet på den ena sidan och stranden på den andra, giver den kloke herravälde på både haf och land ("Sveaborg (Suomenlinna), which touches the sea on one side and the shore on the other, gives the wise control both on sea and on land.")
 Ifrån ödemarker äro desse Vargskiärsholmar ombytte till ett Sveaborg. Eftervard, stå här på egen botn, och lita icke på främmande hielp. ("From desolate lands, these Wolf Islands have been transformed into a Sveaborg (Suomenlinna). Progeny, stand here on your own foundation, and do not rely on foreign help.")

External links
 Kuninkaanportti at the Suomenlinna home page
 Kuninkaanportti at the Finnish ministry of education

Suomenlinna
Gates